The YF-79 is a liquid cryogenic rocket engine burning liquid hydrogen and liquid oxygen in a closed expander cycle. It is China's fourth generation of upper stage cryogenic propellant engine, after the YF-73, YF-75 and the YF-75D. It can do multiple restarts thanks to an electric spark igniter and a prototype was tested at 60% and 100% thrust levels in December 2021.

It will be used on the third stage of the Long March 9.

References

External links
 Engine Manufacturer

Rocket engines using hydrogen propellant
Rocket engines of China
Rocket engines using the expander cycle